Joe Wragg is an English professional footballer who plays as a midfielder for  club Exeter City.

Career
Wragg made his senior debut for Exeter City on 18 October 2022, after coming on as an 73rd-minute substitute for Mitch Beardmore in a 4–1 defeat at Forest Green Rovers in the group stages of the EFL Trophy.

Career statistics

References

Living people
English footballers
Association football midfielders
Exeter City F.C. players
Year of birth missing (living people)